The Sign of Four (2001) is a Canadian television film directed by Rodney Gibbons and starring Matt Frewer and Kenneth Welsh.  The movie is based on Arthur Conan Doyle's second Sherlock Holmes novel published in 1890.

Production

The second of four Holmes adaptations starring Frewer as Holmes, was preceded by The Hound of the Baskervilles in 2000, and then followed by The Royal Scandal (a blend of "A Scandal in Bohemia" and "The Bruce-Partington Plans") also in 2001, and The Case of the Whitechapel Vampire (an original story) in 2002.

Frewer's portrayal of Holmes was largely criticized once again.

Differences from novel
Unlike the source novel, the movie features Holmes meeting with a Scotland Yard chemist named Professor Morgan who not only identifies the poison which killed Bartholomew Sholto but creates an antidote for Holmes.

Tonga is portrayed not as the savage pygmy of the novel but instead as an Asian with facial markings.

Cast 
Matt Frewer as Sherlock Holmes
Kenneth Welsh as Dr. John H. Watson
Johni Keyworth as Major John Sholto
Sophie Lorain as Mary Morstan
Edward Yankie as John Small
Marcel Jeannin as Thaddeus / Bartholomew Sholto
Michel Perron as Inspector Jones

References

External links 

2001 television films
2001 films
Sherlock Holmes films based on works by Arthur Conan Doyle
Canadian television films
2001 in Canadian television
English-language Canadian films
Films directed by Rodney Gibbons
2000s Canadian films